Sami Al-Khaibari (born 18 September 1989) is a Saudi Arabian professional footballer who plays as a centre back for Pro League club Al-Fayha, where he is the club captain.

Career
Al-Khaibari started his career at Al-Ettifaq and remained with the club until 2009. He left the club due to his employment in one of the military sectors. Al-Khaibari signed a semi-professional contract with Al-Fayha in 2012. During this period he also played for the Saudi Arabia national futsal team. During the 2013–14 season, Al-Khaibari helped Al-Fayha win the Second Division and earn promotion to the First Division. He signed his first professional contract with the club on 9 July 2015. During the 2016–17 season, Al-Khaibari helped Al-Fayha win the First Division and earn promotion to the Pro League for the first time in the club's history. Following the departure of club captain Khalid Al-Dubaisi, Al-Khaibari was named as captain ahead of Al-Fayha's debut season in the Pro League. On 1 February 2018, he renewed his contract with the club, tying him until 2021. On 31 October 2020, Al-Khaibari renewed his contract with the club until 2023. During the 2020–21 season, Al-Khaibari captained Al-Fayha to a second-placed finished in the MS League, thus earning promotion to the Pro League once again.

Career statistics

Club

Honours
Al-Fayha
Second Division: 2013–14
MS League/First Division: 2016–17, runner-up 2020–21
King Cup: 2021–22

References

External links
 

1989 births
Living people
People from Dammam
Saudi Arabian footballers
Saudi Arabia international footballers
Association football defenders
Saudi Professional League players
Saudi First Division League players
Saudi Second Division players
Ettifaq FC players
Al-Fayha FC players